Ninja Sex Party is a musical comedy duo based in Los Angeles, consisting of Dan Avidan and Brian Wecht.

Albums

Studio albums

Re-recordings

Live albums

Singles

As lead artist

As featured artist

Notes

References

Discographies of American artists
Discography